Eldermyrmex is an extinct genus of ant in the Formicidae subfamily Dolichoderinae. The genus contains a single described species Eldermyrmex oblongiceps. Eldermyrmex is known to be from the Baltic Amber.

Classification
William Morton Wheeler first made mention of the fossil he described in 1915, but he did not establish the genus Eldermyrmex, as he commented that the ant did not have the appearance of a typical member of genus Iridomyrmex, so he did not know where to assign the newly found ant. Because of its appearance, it was obvious the ant did not belong to the Iridomyrmex, and so it was transferred to a new genus in 2011.

References

†
Monotypic fossil ant genera
Fossil taxa described in 1915
Fossil taxa described in 2011
Prehistoric insects of Europe